Roddy Woomble (born 13 August 1976) is a Scottish singer, songwriter and writer. He is the lead vocalist of indie rock band Idlewild, with whom he has recorded nine studio albums. Celebrated for his poetic lyrics and warm, baritone voice, In 2006, Woomble released his folk-influenced debut solo album, My Secret Is My Silence, and has since released four subsequent studio albums: The Impossible Song & Other Songs (2011), Listen to Keep (2013), The Deluder (2017) and Lo! Soul (2021). In 2020 Woomble released the 'Everyday Sun' EP which featured largely spoken word pieces over minimal, ambient backing. He followed this sound and direction into 2021's 'Lo Soul' which he recorded at home during the COVID-19 pandemic.

In 2007, Woomble curated a collaborative studio album between Scottish writers and musicians, entitled Ballads of the Book, and recorded a collaborative album with folk musicians Kris Drever and John McCusker in 2008, called Before the Ruin.

Musical career

Idlewild

Idlewild was formed in 1995 in Edinburgh by Woomble, Rod Jones, Colin Newton and Phil Scanlon. The band achieved critical and commercial success over nine albums and have toured worldwide. Their sound has moved from the punk rock of their earlier records, to the refined and thoughtful melodic rock of their latter albums. Their last album was 2019's 'Interview Music'. In 2020 they celebrated twenty five years as a band with a special UK tour and accompanying book titled 'In The Beginning There Were Answers; 25 years of Idlewild' which was written by Woomble.

Solo

In 2006, Woomble worked with several musicians including Kate Rusby, Idlewild guitarist Rod Jones and 
Dave Gow and Ailidh Lennon from Sons & Daughters on his debut solo album My Secret Is My Silence, produced by John McCusker. The album was released in July 2006, and Woomble toured the United Kingdom in support of the album's release. My Secret Is My Silence reached number one in the UK Folk Charts. A year later, on 10 July 2007, My Secret Is My Silence was released in the US on 7–10 Music.

Woomble's follow-up album, Before the Ruin, written and recorded with Kris Drever and John McCusker, was released on 15 September 2008 through Navigator Records.

In 2009 Woomble re-located to the Isle of Mull in the Scottish Hebrides and began work on a new album entitled 'The Impossible Song & other songs'. It was released in 2011 and was recorded entirely at the An Tobar arts centre in Tobermory on the Isle of Mull and features a cast of musicians from the Scottish folk scene. The album was accompanied by extensive touring around the U.K. 

The country influenced Listen to Keep followed in 2013, before Woomble concentrated again on Idlewild, returning attention back to his solo career with 2017's The Deluder, a darker and more introspective album. After the release of 2019's Interview Music album with Idlewild, Woomble changed direction again with the Everyday Sun EP (2020) and Lo! Soul (2021) which both share a minimal, electronic sound.

Writings

Woomble has published two books - a collection of his lyrics and poems entitled Instrumentals (2016) and a retrospective book about Idlewild In the Beginning There Were Answers (2020). He has also written columns and articles for a selection of publications including The Sunday Herald, The List, The Idler and The Great Outdoors.

Personal life

Woomble moved frequently during his childhood, living in Scotland, France, England and the United States. After Idlewild's initial success he lived in London, then New York City before relocating back to Glasgow in 2005. Since 2008 he has lived on the Isle of Mull.

Discography

Studio albums
My Secret Is My Silence (2006)
Before the Ruin (2008) (with Kris Drever and John McCusker)
The Impossible Song & Other Songs (2011)
Listen to Keep (2013)
The Deluder (2017)
Lo! Soul (2021)

EPs
Everyday Sun (2020)

Live albums
Live at Kings Place (2014) (as Roddy Woomble & Band)

See also

 Scottish folk music
 Edinburgh culture

References

External links
 Roddy Woomble official website

1976 births
Living people
21st-century Scottish male singers
Scottish songwriters
People from Irvine, North Ayrshire
20th-century Scottish male singers
British male songwriters